Dimitris Varos (1949 – 7 September 2017, Athens) was a Greek poet, journalist, and photographer.

Career 
He has been director and editor-in-chief of many Greek national newspapers, including Chiakos Laos, Acropolis, Ethnos, Proti, Ethnos tis Kyriakis, Typos tis Kyriakis and many national magazines. He was the director of print and electronic publications at Technoekdotiki that publishes 7 monthly magazines.

Dimitris Varos was also the creator of a number of printing media in Greece such as "Ethnos tis Kyriakis", "TV Ethnos", "Time Out", "Ergasia", "New Gen", "IQ", "Pame Athina", "Relax", "Helliniki Naftiliaki", "Kefaleo", "Car & Truck", "Logistics & management", "Ecotec" and others.

As a poet he published four books and his poetry was translated in English. Parts of one of those books (“Thirasia”) were set to music by Greek composer Giannis Markopoulos in his music CDs “Electric Theseus”, “Unities”, “Daring Communications”, “50 years" Giannis Markopoulos and performed by Pavlos Sidiropoulos and the group “Nei Epivates” in the ancient theater Herodion in Athens. Lyrics of Dimitris Varos were also used by rock group “Vox” in their third CD.

Publications  
 We are Greeks. 2012, Bookstars Editions.  Humour
 Phryne (Φρύνη). 2000, Kastaniotis Editions.  Greek poetry
 Thirasia (Θηρασία). 1997, Kastaniotis Editions.  Greek poetry
 Andromeda (Ανδρομέδα), Chios Art-lovers Association Editions. Greek poetry
 O stranger (Ω ξειν), Independent edition. Greek poetry

Notes 

<Interview>: http://www.pirenesfountain.com/archives/issue_03/showcase.html

External links 
 Homepage – includes projects Mind Games, We are Greeks, Painting with a camera
 Photographic Portfolio

1949 births
2017 deaths
Greek journalists
Writers from Chios